Derek Wilson may refer to:
 Derek Wilson (architect) (1922–2016), New Zealand architect
 Derek Wilson (actor), American actor
 Derek Wilson (basketball) (born 1967), American basketball player